The 1886 Epsom Derby was a horse race which took place at Epsom Downs on 26 May 1886. It was the 106th running of the Derby, and it was won by Ormonde. The winner was ridden by Fred Archer and trained by John Porter. At the initial nomination stage 205 entries were received. At the beginning of 1886 Ormonde, Minting and Saraband were all a similar price for the Derby, around 11/2, with The Bard at 6/1. Neither Minting or Saraband lined up at Epsom though, both having been easily beaten by Ormonde in the 2000 Guineas.

Race details
 Prize money: £4,700
 Number of runners: 9
 Winner's time: 2m 45.6s

Full result

‡Odds of 1000/5 are for Coracle and Ariel coupled

* The distances between the horses are shown in lengths or shorter. shd = short-head; hd = head; PU = pulled up.

Winner's details
Further details of the winner, Ormonde:

 Foaled: 1883
 Sire: Bend Or; Dam: Lily Agnes (Macaroni)
 Owner: Duke of Westminster
 Breeder: Duke of Westminster

Form analysis

Two-year-old races
Notable runs by the future Derby participants as two-year-olds in 1885:
 Ormonde – 1st in Dewhurst Plate
 The Bard – 1st in Brocklesby Stakes, 1st in Westminster Stakes, 1st in Hyde Park Plate, 1st in New Biennial Stakes, 1st in July Plate
 St. Mirin – unplaced in July Stakes, unplaced in Middle Park Plate
 Button Park - unplaced in Middle Park Plate

Road to Epsom
Notable runs by the future Derby participants as three-year-olds:
 Ormonde – 1st in 2000 Guineas
 St. Mirin – unplaced in 2000 Guineas
 Button Park - unplaced in Payne Stakes
 Coracle – unplaced in 2000 Guineas

Subsequent wins
Notable wins by the Derby participants:
 Ormonde – St. James's Palace Stakes (1886), Hardwicke Stakes (1886), Champion Stakes (1886 & 1887), St Leger (1886), Imperial Gold Cup (1887)
 The Bard – Goodwood Cup (1886)
 St. Mirin – Liverpool Cup (1887)

References

 Race Report - The Press
 Race Report - Auckland Star
 Race Report - Huddersfield Chronicle

Epsom Derby
 1886
Epsom Derby
Epsom Derby
19th century in Surrey